In military terms, 30th regiment may refer to:


Infantry regiments
 30th (Cambridgeshire) Regiment of Foot, British Army
 30th Light Dragoons, British Army
 30th Infantry Regiment (United States)

Regiments in the American Civil War

Confederate States Army 
 30th Arkansas Infantry Regiment
 30th Georgia Volunteer Infantry

Union Army 
 30th Connecticut Infantry Regiment (Colored)
 30th Indiana Infantry Regiment
 30th Illinois Infantry Regiment
 30th Iowa Volunteer Infantry Regiment
 30th Regiment Kentucky Volunteer Mounted Infantry
 30th Regiment Massachusetts Volunteer Infantry
 30th Maine Volunteer Infantry Regiment
 30th Michigan Volunteer Infantry Regiment
 30th New York Volunteer Infantry Regiment
 30th Wisconsin Volunteer Infantry Regiment

Artillery regiments
 30th Field Artillery Regiment (Canada)
 30th Field Artillery Regiment (United States)

See also
 30th Army (disambiguation)
 XXX Corps (disambiguation)
 30th Battalion (disambiguation)
 30th Division (disambiguation)
 30 Squadron (disambiguation)